Secondary lymphedema is a condition characterized by swelling of the soft tissues in which an excessive amount of lymph has accumulated, and is caused by certain malignant diseases such as Hodgkin's disease and Kaposi sarcoma.

Secondary lymphedema also can be caused by several non-malignant diseases, such as lipedema, and can result from the removal of lymph nodes during various cancer surgeries, especially for breast and prostate cancers.

See also 
 Lymphedema
 Skin lesion

References 

Vascular-related cutaneous conditions